Fan Fraith is a top of Fan Gyhirych in the Fforest Fawr section of the Brecon Beacons National Park in the county of Powys, south Wales.  Its summit is at a height of 2192 feet or 668 m. It lies within Fforest Fawr Geopark.

Geology
The bulk of the hill is formed from sandstones and mudstones of the Brownstones Formation of the Old Red Sandstone laid down during the Devonian period. Sandstones of the overlying Plateau Beds Formation occur in the summit area as do beds of the Grey Grits Formation - both are assigned to the upper Devonian. The Plateau Beds sandstones occur across the whole southern aspect of the mountain and are often present as boulder fields,a result of periglacial activity. Several geological faults affect these rocks, the most significant of which is the northeast-southwest aligned Swansea Fault, a part of the Cribarth Disturbance.

Access
The hill is entirely within access land and freely available to walkers. A private vehicular track which runs over the southeastern shoulder of neighbouring Fan Gyhirych affords the easiest and most commonly used ascent of Fan Fraith.

References

External links
images of Fan Fraith & surrounding area on Geograph website

Mountains and hills of Powys
Fforest Fawr
Nuttalls